Hartford Township is one of twelve townships in Adams County, Indiana. At the 2010 census, its population was 872.

Geography

Unincorporated towns
 Linn Grove
 Perryville
(This list is based on USGS data and may include former settlements.)

Adjacent townships
 French Township (north)
 Monroe Township (northeast)
 Wabash Township (east)
 Bearcreek Township, Jay County (southeast)
 Jackson Township, Jay County (south)
 Nottingham Township, Wells County (west)
 Harrison Township, Wells County (northwest)

Major highways

Cemeteries
The township contains these cemeteries: Alberson, Brown (Glendening), Greenwood (also known as Steiner, Linn Grove, or Buena Vista) and Hartford (Stringtown).

School districts
 South Adams Schools

Political districts
 Indiana's 6th congressional district
 State House District 79
 State Senate District 19

References
 
 United States Census Bureau 2007 TIGER/Line Shapefiles
 United States National Atlas

External links
 Indiana Township Association
 United Township Association of Indiana

Townships in Adams County, Indiana
Townships in Indiana